The Denham Springs City Hall, also known as the Old Denham Springs City Hall, is a historic building located at 115 Mattie Street in Denham Springs, Louisiana.

Built in the late 1930s by the WPA and last used in the 1980s, the building is a two-story concrete structure in Art Deco style. A complete restoration, costing some $695,000, was completed in late 2008 and rededication ceremonies held on April 17.  The building now serves as a tourism office, where maps and information are distributed to people visiting the Antique Village.  The original building housed the mayor and sheriff's offices, library, and the jail.

The building was listed in the National Register of Historic Places listings in Louisiana on April 16, 1993.

See also
National Register of Historic Places listings in Livingston Parish, Louisiana

References

External links

Detailed Description
Photos on Livingston Parish website 1
Photos on Livingston Parish website 2
Slide show photos after renovation
3D photo and rotating image

City and town halls on the National Register of Historic Places in Louisiana
Art Deco architecture in Louisiana
Buildings and structures in Livingston Parish, Louisiana
National Register of Historic Places in Livingston Parish, Louisiana
Government buildings completed in 1940
1940 establishments in Louisiana